Stinë dashurie (English: Love season) is a Kosovan television soap opera, created and directed by Gazmend Nela.

The series premiered on RTK, the public service broadcaster in Kosovo, on Sunday, March 9, 2014, at 8:30 p.m. It is a production of Cineproduction. Shooting for the second season started on October 1, 2014 and ended in April 2015.

Overview
The television series addresses issues that are prevalent to modern Kosovo. Alban Krasniqi (Arben Biba), who lives in Switzerland, comes to Kosovo to work for EULEX. Here, he meets an Albanian girl, Mimoza Ukaj (Albulena Kryeziu) and falls in love with her. What Alban doesn't know is that their families have been feuding for years. The series deals with concepts of ideal love, and other elements of modern Albanian society such as corruption and blood feud.

Episodes

References

Albanian television shows
2010s Albanian television series
2014 Albanian television series debuts